Kesses is a constituency in Kenya, one of six constituencies in Uasin Gishu County, the member of parliament for this constituency is Dr Mishra Swarap Chelule.

Locations and Wards

References 

Constituencies in Uasin Gishu County